The 2018–19 Burkinabé Premier League is the 57th edition of the Burkinabé Premier League, the top-tier football league in Burkina Faso, since its establishment in 1961. It began on 31 August 2018.

League table

Top scorers

References

Premier League
Premier League
Burkina Faso
Burkinabé Premier League seasons